The San Benito River is a  long river flowing northwesterly between the Diablo Range and the Gabilan Range, on the Central Coast of California. The river begins in southeasternmost San Benito County, California and ends in the extreme northwestern part of the county, where it is tributary to the Pajaro River. The San Benito River is longer than the Pajaro River and it drains more area, although it has proportionally lower flows.

History
Father Juan Crespí, in his expedition in 1772, named the river in honor of San Benito (Spanish)/ Saint Benedict (English), the patron saint of monasticism.

Watershed and Course

The San Benito River drains a  watershed. Tres Pinos Creek is its major tributary. From its headwaters at elevation at  beginning southeast of Santa Rita Peak in the Diablo Range at extreme southern San Benito County, the river flows to Hernandez Reservoir, formed by a dam built in the early 1960s for irrigation supply and flood control. Below the dam, the streambed is mostly dry during the summer, as the Central Coast receives almost all of its rain during the winter.

Geology
The surrounding mineral soils come from serpentine which has naturally occurring asbestos. Mining of asbestos, sand, gravel and gypsum has and continues to degrade the watershed. In portions of the river you will find homeless camps, trash, concrete, evidence of mining damage, and the occasional fossil.  California's official state gem, Benitoite, was first discovered in the headwaters of the river. The mineral is named after its county of origin, San Benito County.

Ecology
After restoration of trash removal near the mouth of the San Benito River by the conservation group, CHEER, juvenile steelhead trout (Oncorhynchus mykiss) returned, indicating that successful spawning and rearing habitat is now present after a 75 year absence. In a 1940 correspondence, California Department of Fish and Wildlife (CDFW) stated that San Benito Creek “is a good trout stream in its headwaters” with “considerable runs of sea-run steelhead” in some years. However, 1962 CDFW correspondence stated that the “small sporadic run of steelhead” in the San Benito River “has been largely if not completely eliminated by the construction of the Hernandez Project" southeast of the community of San Benito, California.

See also
 Clear Creek (San Benito River)
 List of rivers of California

References

Columbia Gazetteer of North America

Rivers of Fresno County, California
Rivers of San Benito County, California
Diablo Range
Gabilan Range
Hollister, California
Rivers of Northern California
Tributaries of the Pajaro River